Gaiella occulta is a rod-shaped and non-motile bacterium from the genus of Gaiella which has been isolated from deep mineral water in Portugal.

References

 

Actinomycetota
Bacteria described in 2012